The 2018 Moldovan "A" Division was the 28th season of Moldovan football's second-tier league. The season started on 21 April 2018 and ended on 3 November 2018. Victoria Bardar were the defending champions, after winning their first title in the competition in the previous season.

Teams

Season summary

League table

Results
Teams will play each other twice (once home, once away).

Results by round
The following table represents the teams game results in each round.

Top goalscorers

Clean sheets

References

External links
Divizia A - Moldova - Results, fixtures, tables and news - divizia-a.md

Moldovan Liga 1 seasons
Moldova 2